1898 in philosophy

Events 
 The "Generation of '98" writers and thinkers are active in Spain.

Publications 
 Ebenezer Howard, To-Morrow: A Peaceful Path to Real Reform
 Alfred Henry Lloyd, Dynamic Idealism
 Simon Newcomb, "The Philosophy of Hyperspace", Bulletin of the American Mathematical Society

Births 
 May 19 - Julius Evola (died 1974)
 November 9 - Owen Barfield (died 1997)
 November 14 - Benjamin Fondane (died 1944)

Deaths

References 

Philosophy
19th-century philosophy
Philosophy by year